Timon & Pumbaa's Jungle Games is a 1995 party video game developed by 7th Level and published by Disney Interactive Studios. The game was released in 1995 for Microsoft Windows under the "Disney Gamebreak" brand. A Super Nintendo Entertainment System port, developed by Tiertex and published by THQ, was released in North America and PAL territories in November 1997 and March 1998, respectively. It can be installed on Windows 3.1, 95, 98 or later, but was added to Windows Me and later on Windows XP; the game gained popularity subsequent to its inclusion in the latter.

Gameplay
Timon and Pumbaa's Jungle Games consists of five mini-games featuring Timon and Pumbaa, as well as other jungle animals from The Lion King. The games are Jungle Pinball (a pinball game where the board is filled with animals instead of bumpers), Burper (a shooter type game, using Pumbaa to belch gas), Hippo Hop (concept similar to Frogger), Bug Drop (based on Puyo Puyo), and Slingshooter (a slingshot game) accessible directly from the menu. The mini-games are endless where players try to top their high scores. Bug Drop is omitted from the SNES version, since the system has its own port of Puyo Puyo in the form of Kirby's Avalanche.

Voices
 Ernie Sabella as Pumbaa
 Kevin Schon as Timon

See also
List of Disney video games

References

The Lion King (franchise) video games
1995 video games
Super Nintendo Entertainment System games
Windows games
MacOS games
Video games set in Africa
Disney video games
THQ games
Tiertex Design Studios games
Multiplayer and single-player video games
Video games developed in the United States
Pinball video games
7th Level games